Wit is a form of humour.

Wit or WIT may also refer to:

Arts, entertainment, and media
 Wit (play), a 1995 one-act play by American playwright Margaret Edson
 Wit (film), a 2001 film directed based on the play
 Wit Studio, a Japanese animation studio
 Washington Improv Theater, in Washington, D.C., United States
 Wellington Improvisation Troupe, in Wellington, New Zealand

Education
 Walchand Institute of Technology, in Solapur, Maharashtra, India
 Waterford Institute of Technology, in Waterford, Ireland
 Wentworth Institute of Technology, in Boston, Massachusetts, United States
 Wessex Institute of Technology, in Hampshire, United Kingdom
 Western Institute of TAFE, in New South Wales, Australia
 Wufeng Institute of Technology, in Chiayi, Taiwan

People
 Wit Busza, physicist and professor at the Massachusetts Institute of Technology
 Antoni Wit (born 1944), Polish conductor
 Dennis Wit (born 1951), American retired soccer player

Other uses
 Wit, any of the five wits or senses in premodern psychology
 WIT, NYSE symbol for Wipro, an Indian IT multinational company
 Wit FM, a French radio station based in Bègles, near Bordeaux
 Time zone in Indonesia:
  (Eastern Indonesian Time), a time zone covering eastern Indonesia
 Western Indonesian Time, abbreviated "WIT" in tz database
 Witbier, a popular Belgian ale
 Women in Touch, a women's discussion group in Zimbabwe
 FC WIT Georgia, a football team in the country of Georgia

See also
 de Wit (surname)
 WITS (disambiguation)
 Witt (disambiguation)
 Wyt (disambiguation)